Neocaridina bamana is a freshwater shrimp found in the Guangxi region of China. Besides that the species lives in freshwater, little is known about its habitat due to a lack of data about the collection site.

References

Atyidae
Freshwater crustaceans of Asia
Crustaceans described in 2004